Don's Plum is a 2001 black-and-white independent drama film directed by R. D. Robb, starring Leonardo DiCaprio, Tobey Maguire and Kevin Connolly. It was filmed in 1995–1996, and written by Robb with Bethany Ashton, Tawd Beckman, David Stutman and Dale Wheatley. The film takes place over the course of one night in which a group of young adults discuss life while eating at a diner.

The film was blocked from release in the U.S. and Canada, as DiCaprio and Maguire claim that they had only agreed to star in a short film but not a feature film.

Blake Sennett of Rilo Kiley provided the soundtrack for the film. His bandmate Jenny Lewis has a role as Sara.

It is the second film collaboration between Maguire and DiCaprio, the first being This Boy's Life, released in 1993, and the third being The Great Gatsby, released in 2013.

Premise

The film is centered around a group of young male friends, about 20 years old, who meet at a Los Angeles restaurant, Don's Plum, every Saturday night. The four friends like to bring new girls they've picked up to hang out with them. Dramatic verbal and physical altercations ensue between the friends and other people they taunt and tangle with in the restaurant. Naturalistic in its character depictions, filmed in black-and-white and with most of the action taking place inside the diner, there is very little concrete plot. Some of the power dynamics between the young men surface as they "discuss their latest misadventures in their miserable lives," according to IMDB.

Cast
 Leonardo DiCaprio as Derek
 Tobey Maguire as Ian
 Kevin Connolly as Jeremy
 Scott Bloom as Brad
 Jenny Lewis as Sara
 Amber Benson as Amy
 Heather McComb as Constance
 Meadow Sisto as Juliet
 Marissa Ribisi as Tracy
 Nikki Cox as Karen
 Jeremy Sisto as Bernard
 Ethan Suplee as Big Bum

Production 
Much of the film is improvised.
DiCaprio and Maguire were paid $575 per day to appear in the film.

Release issues 
DiCaprio and Maguire were opposed to having the film released. According to them, the film was pitched to them as a short film but was later re-edited into a feature-length film. Producer David Stutman alleges that Maguire opposed the film's release due to his improvised performance revealing too much about him.

Stutman filed a lawsuit in 1998 against DiCaprio and Maguire. They settled on allowing the film to be released outside the U.S. and Canada, and had some scenes removed.

Free streaming 
In 2014, Dale Wheatley published an open letter to DiCaprio on the website freedonsplum.com, giving his take on the history of the film and the ensuing legal issues. Wheatley also uploaded the film to the website so that it could be streamed for free. It was removed in January 2016 after a third-party notification by DiCaprio and Maguire claiming infringement. Wheatley made the following statement to Fox News: "It saddens me deeply that in 2016 we witness the senseless oppression of film and art by one of America's most beloved actors". "While the world celebrates — and certainly Americans celebrate — his great achievements in cinema, he chooses to use an iron fist to suppress the work of many other artists including him in a film made 20 years ago."

Reception
It premiered on February 10, 2001, in Berlin. Time Out New York writer Mike D'Angelo called it "the best film [I saw] in Berlin". Variety Magazine called it an "unpleasant and tedious ensemble."

See also
 My Dinner with Andre

References

External links 
 
 archive.org

2001 films
2001 drama films
2001 independent films
American black-and-white films
American drama films
Danish black-and-white films
Danish drama films
Swedish black-and-white films
Swedish drama films
2000s English-language films
2000s American films
2000s Swedish films